William Holliday may refer to:

William Holliday (merchant) (c. 1565–1624), London merchant and chairman of the East India Company
William Holliday (rugby league) (born 1939), English rugby league player
William H. Holliday (1843–1925), American politician in the Wyoming Legislature

See also
William Halliday (disambiguation)